Tectarius is a genus of sea snails, marine gastropod mollusks in the family Littorinidae, the winkles or periwinkles.

Species
Species within the genus Tectarius include:

 Tectarius antonii (Philippi, 1846)
 Tectarius coronatus Valenciennes, 1833
 Tectarius cumingii (Philippi, 1846)
 Tectarius grandinatus (Gmelin, 1791)
 Tectarius niuensis Reid & Geller, 1997
 Tectarius pagodus (Linnaeus, 1758)
 Tectarius rusticus (Philippi, 1846)
 Tectarius spinulosus (Philippi, 1847)
 Tectarius striatus (King & Broderip, 1832)
 Tectarius tectumpersicum (Linnaeus, 1758)
 Tectarius viviparus (Rosewater, 1982)
Species brought into synonymy
 Tectarius bullatus (Martyn, 1784): synonym of Tectarius grandinatus (Gmelin, 1791)
 Tectarius feejeensis (Reeve, 1857): synonym of Echinolittorina feejeensis (Reeve, 1857)
 Tectarius granosus (Philippi, 1845): synonym of Echinolittorina granosa (Philippi, 1845)
 Tectarius miliaris (Quoy & Gaimard, 1832): synonym of  Echinolittorina miliaris (Quoy & Gaimard, 1833)
 Tectarius montrouzieri P. Fischer, 1878: synonym of Perrinia angulifera (A. Adams, 1853)
 Tectarius muricatus (Linnaeus, 1758): synonym of Cenchritis muricatus (Linnaeus, 1758)
Subgenus Tectarius (Echininus) represented as Echininus Clench & Abbott, 1942 (alternate representation)

References

Further reading
 Bandel, K. & D. Kadolsky (1982). Western Atlantic Species of Nodolittorina (Gastropda: Prosobranchia): comparative morphology and its functional, ecological, phylogenetic and taxonomic implications. Veliger 25 (1): 1-42.
 Reid D.G. (1989). Systematic revision of the Recent species of Peasiella Nevill, 1885 (Gastropoda: Littorinidae), with notes on the fossil species. The Nautilus 103(2): 43-69
 Reid D.G. & Geller J.B. (1997). A new ovoviviparious species of Tectarius (Gastropoda: Littorinidae) from Niue, South Pacific, with a molecular phylogeny of the genus. Journal of Molluscan Studies 63:207-233

External links

Littorinidae